Dmitry Igorevich Kiselyov (born June 5, 1978)  is a Russian film director.

Filmography

Film
 Black Lightning (2009)
 Yolki (2010)
 Yolki 2 (2011)
 Gentlemens of Fortune! (2012)
 Yolki 3 (2013)
 Yolki 1914 (2014)
 The Age of Pioneers (2017) 
 Yolki 6 (2017)
 Mira (2023)

TV series
 Londongrad (2015)
 Bones (2016)

References

External links

1978 births
Living people
Russian film directors
Russian music video directors